The cartography of Ukraine involves the history of surveying and the construction of maps of Ukraine.

Early maps
Maps of Ukraine have been produced since the late mediaeval period.  During the  Turkish wars between 1568 and 1918, high-quality French maps were kept as state secrets amid diplomatic negotiations, while 20th-century maps have reflected the region's multiple changes of government.

Ukraine is largely absent from the maps of the Turkish manuscript mapping-tradition that flourished during the reign of the Ottoman Sultan Mehmed II the Conqueror; the  Mediterranean received its own section in world maps, but typical Turkish maps of the period omitted the Black Sea, and the entire region of the Rus' appeared as just a small portion of Asia between the  Caspian and the Mediterranean.

17th century
Two centuries later  Guillaume le Vasseur, sieur de Beauplan became one of the more prominent cartographers working with Ukrainian data.  His 1639 descriptive map of the region was the first such one produced, and after he published a pair of Ukraine maps of different scale in 1660, his drawings were republished throughout much of Europe.  A copy of de Beauplan's maps played a crucial rôle in negotiations between the Polish-Lithuanian Commonwealth and the Ottoman Empire in 1640; its depiction of the disputed Kodak Fortress was of such quality that the head Polish ambassador, Wojciech Miaskowski, deemed it dangerous to exhibit it to his Turkish counterparts.

Giacomo Cantelli da Vignola's 1684 map of Tartaria d'Europa
includes "Vkraina o Paese dei Cossachi de Zaporowa" [Ukraine or the land of the Zaporozhian Cossacks].

18th century
English-language maps of 1769 depicted the Crimean Khanate as part of its suzerain, the Ottoman Empire, with clear boundaries between the Muslim-ruled states in the south and the  Christian-ruled states to the north.  Another map from the eighteenth century, inscribed in Latin, was careful to depict a small buffer zone between Kiev and the Polish border.

Modern maps 
In more recent history, maps of the country have reflected its tumultuous political status and relations with Russia; for example, the city known as "Lvov" during the Soviet era (until 1991) was depicted as "Leopol" or "Lemberg" during its time (1772-1918) in the Habsburg realms, while post-Soviet maps produced in Ukraine have referred to it by its endonym of "Lviv". (Under Polish rule (1272-1772) it went by the Polish name of Lwów.)

See also
 Geography of Ukraine

References

External links

 Ukraine on old maps from the National Atlas of Ukraine
 Old maps of Ukraine Historical maps from Old Maps Online

 
Ukraine